The New Seditionaires is the fourth studio album released by American punk band Lower Class Brats. It was released in 2006 on TKO Records.

Track list

References

2006 albums
Lower Class Brats albums